Joseph Brough (9 November 1886 – 5 October 1968) was an English footballer. He was also an accomplished cycler and sprinter.

Able to play at half-back or as a forward, he began his professional career with Burslem Port Vale in February 1907. He transferred to Stoke later in the year, before finding himself at Tottenham Hotspur. Failing to make an impression in London, he returned to Port Vale in 1909, and scored a club record 43 goals in the 1909–10 season. This won him a move to Liverpool in August 1910, though after falling from the first team picture he moved on to Bristol City in January 1912. He again returned to Port Vale in May 1913, before he saw action in World War I in 1917. He retired from professional football in 1922, having featured in 209 competitive games for Port Vale.

Career
Brough played for Smallthorne, before he joined Burslem Port Vale as an amateur in the autumn of 1906, signing professional forms in February 1907. He scored his first Second Division goal on 13 April 1907, in a 2–1 win over Hull City at the Athletic Ground. This was his only goal in 12 appearances in the 1906–07 season. The club then went into liquidation, and Brough transferred to Stoke. He appeared in just the one game for the "Potters" in 1907–08, and then went on to appear in one league and one cup game for Tottenham Hotspur in 1908.

Brough returned to Port Vale in 1909 in a centre-forward capacity, and scored a club record of 43 league and cup goals in the 1909–10 season, helping the club to the Staffordshire Junior Cup title in the process. He signed for Liverpool in August 1910, and played 11 First Division games in the 1910–11 season. He moved on from playing reserve team football at Anfield, and signed with Second Division side Bristol City in January 1912. He scored 11 goals in 22 league games for the "Robins" in 1911–12.

A third move to Vale followed in May 1913. He bagged 35 goals in the 1913–14 season, but was conscripted to fight in World War I in 1917. He was demobilised in October 1919 and continued playing for the Vale, winning the Staffordshire Senior Cup and North Staffordshire Infirmary Cup titles in 1920. He scored six goals in 25 appearances in the 1919–20 season, hit one goal in 33 appearances in 1920–21, and then scored once in nine games in 1921–22. Brough then left The Old Recreation Ground after feeling that he was too "worn out" to continue to play professional football. In all, he played a total of 209 matches (including 72 in the English Football League) for Port Vale, and scored 111 goals (including 6 in the Football League).

Personal life
Brough was a sprinter and cyclist. He died 5 October 1968 at the age of 81.

Career statistics
Source:

References

1886 births
1968 deaths
Sportspeople from Burslem
English footballers
Association football midfielders
Association football forwards
Port Vale F.C. players
Stoke City F.C. players
Tottenham Hotspur F.C. players
Liverpool F.C. players
Bristol City F.C. players
English Football League players
British Army personnel of World War I